David Maurer may refer to:

 David W. Maurer (1906–1981), professor of linguistics

See also
 Dave Maurer (disambiguation)